The New South Wales Australian of the Year Award is given annually on Australia Day. The award "offers an insight into Australian identity, reflecting the nation's evolving relationship with world, the role of sport in Australian culture, the impact of multiculturalism, and the special status of Australia's Indigenous people".

The national level awards, four in total, are chosen exclusively from the state and territory award recipients.

The following is a list of the recipients of the New South Wales Australian of the Year award.

See also
 List of Senior Australian of the Year Award recipients
 List of Young Australian of the Year Award recipients
 List of Australian Local Hero Award recipients
 List of South Australian of the Year Award recipients
 List of Queensland Australian of the Year award recipients

References

Lists of Australian award winners
Australian of the Year